Daniel Abadi is the Darnell-Kanal Professor of Computer Science at University of Maryland, College Park and was named an ACM Fellow in 2020. His primary area of research is database systems. He is known for his contributions to distributed databases, column-store databases, deterministic databases, graph databases, and stream databases. Specifically, he developed the storage and query execution engines of the C-Store (column-oriented database) prototype, which was commercialized by Vertica and later acquired by Hewlett-Packard in 2011. His HadoopDB research on fault tolerant scalable analytical database systems was commercialized by Hadapt and acquired by Teradata in 2014.

Abadi was the first to describe the PACELC theorem in a 2010 blog post. PACELC, a response to the CAP theorem, was proved formally in 2018 in a SIGACT News article.

Abadi currently is an advisor for FaunaDB. Abadi was a recipient of the VLDB Test of Time Award for a 2009 publication titled HadoopDB: an architectural hybrid of MapReduce and DBMS technologies for analytical workloads.

References

External links 

University of Maryland, College Park faculty
Year of birth missing (living people)
Nationality missing
Computer scientists
Living people